"Jeeves Saves the Cow-Creamer" is the first episode of the second series of the 1990s British comedy television series Jeeves and Wooster. It is also called "The Silver Jug". Filming took place at Highclere Castle which was the principal location for Totleigh Towers.

In the US, "Jeeves Saves the Cow-Creamer" was aired as the fourth episode of the fourth series of Jeeves and Wooster on 29 January 1995 on Masterpiece Theatre. The episode "Introduction on Broadway" was aired as the first episode of the second series instead.

Background 
Adapted from The Code of the Woosters.

Cast
 Jeeves – Stephen Fry
 Bertie Wooster – Hugh Laurie
 Aunt Dahlia – Vivian Pickles
 Roderick Spode – John Turner
 Sir Watkyn Bassett – John Woodnutt
 Stiffy Byng – Charlotte Attenborough
 Madeline Bassett – Diana Blackburn
 Gussie Fink-Nottle – Richard Garnett
 Rev. Stinker Pinker – Simon Treves
 Constable Oates – Campbell Morrison
 Barmy Fotheringay-Phipps – Martin Clunes
 Proprietor – Harry Landis
 Drones Porter – Michael Ripper

Plot
Aunt Dahlia sends Bertie to "sneer" at an antique, silver cow creamer, in order to keep its price down. He accidentally brings the antique to the attention of rival collector Sir Watkyn Bassett, who buys it. Dahlia sends Bertie to get the creamer back at all costs. Jeeves steals the unique silver cow creamer, using it as the car/motor mascot and hiding it as a hood/bonnet ornament and radiator cap on Wooster's car.

Sir Roderick Spode is appalled when he learns that Madeline Bassett is engaged to Gussie Fink-Nottle. Gussie is naturally terrified of Spode, and even the smallest misunderstanding will put his life in jeopardy.  Spode has two jobs—he is the leader of the Black Shorts, a tiny multi-aged group dressed in black shorts, but also designs and sells women's underwear, being the proprietor of a lingerie shop called Eulalie Soeurs. He is perpetually in fear that his followers in his first role will discover his second one and it is the threat of this disclosure which is used by Jeeves to stop him assaulting Bertie. Jeeves reveals the secret pseudonym "Eulalie" and finds a way of keeping Spode from beating Bertie into a jelly.

See also
 List of Jeeves and Wooster characters

References

External links

Jeeves and Wooster episodes
1991 British television episodes